A Night to Remember may refer to:

Film, literature, and television 
 A Night to Remember (1942 film), an American mystery comedy starring Loretta Young and Brian Aherne
 A Night to Remember (book), a 1955 book by Walter Lord about the sinking of the RMS Titanic
 A Night to Remember (Kraft Television Theatre), a 1956 live television performance on NBC
 A Night to Remember (1958 film), a British adaptation of Lord's book, directed by Roy Ward Baker
 "A Night to Remember", a 1985 episode of The Raccoons
 "A Night to Remember" (Mad Men), a 2008 episode of Mad Men
 "Chapter Thirty-One: A Night to Remember", a 2018 episode of Riverdale

Music

Albums and DVDs 
 A Night to Remember: Pop Meets Classic, a 2003 concert DVD by Sarah Connor
 A Night to Remember (Joe Diffie album) (1999)
 A Night to Remember (Evergrey album) (2005)
 A Night to Remember (Cyndi Lauper album) (1989)
 A Night to Remember (Johnny Mathis album) (2008)
 A Night to Remember (Shonlock Album) (2014)

Songs 
 "A Night to Remember" (Joe Diffie song) (1999)
 "A Night to Remember" (High School Musical song), a 2008 song from the film High School Musical 3: Senior Year
 "A Night to Remember" (Cyndi Lauper song) (1989)
 "A Night to Remember" (Shalamar song), a 1982 song later covered by 911 and Liberty X
 "A Night to Remember" (U96 song) (1996)